Ryedale was a constituency in North Yorkshire represented in the House of Commons of the Parliament of the United Kingdom. It elected one Member of Parliament (MP) by the first past the post system of election. It was created in 1983 and abolished in 2010.

History
This was traditionally a safe Conservative seat, although it was briefly taken by Elizabeth Shields for the Liberal Party, following a by-election in 1986 held following the death of MP John Spence.

Boundaries
1983–1997: The District of Ryedale wards of Amotherby, Ampleforth, Birdsall, Clifton Without, Dales, Ebberston, Haxby North East, Haxby West, Helmsley, Hovingham, Huntington North, Huntington South, Kirby Misperton, Kirkbymoorside, Malton, New Earswick, Norton, Pickering, Rawcliffe, Rillington, Sherburn, Sheriff Hutton, Skelton, Stockton and Bossall, Strensall, Thornton Dale, and Wigginton, the District of Hambleton wards of Crayke, Easingwold, Helperby, Huby-Sutton, Shipton, Stillington, and Tollerton, and the Borough of Scarborough wards of Filey and Hertford.

1997–2010: The District of Ryedale wards of Amotherby, Ampleforth, Birdsall, Dales, Ebberston, Helmsley, Hovingham, Huntington North, Huntington South, Kirby Misperton, Kirkbymoorside, Malton, Norton, Osbaldwick and Heworth, Pickering, Rillington, Sherburn, Sheriff Hutton, Stockton and Bosall, Strensall, and Thornton Dale, and the Borough of Scarborough wards of Filey and Hertford.

The constituency was created in 1983 and at the time of its abolition in 2010, covered Ryedale (including Malton, Norton-on-Derwent, Helmsley and Pickering), Filey and the north eastern suburbs of York (including Huntington, Strensall, Osbaldwick and Heworth Without).

Boundary review
Following the Boundary Commission for England's review of parliamentary representation in North Yorkshire, Ryedale constituency was abolished, with its electoral wards being used to form a new Thirsk and Malton seat. These changes were implemented in 2010.

Members of Parliament

Elections

Elections in the 2000s

Elections in the 1990s

Elections in the 1980s

See also
 List of parliamentary constituencies in North Yorkshire

Notes and references

Parliamentary constituencies in Yorkshire and the Humber (historic)
Constituencies of the Parliament of the United Kingdom established in 1983
Constituencies of the Parliament of the United Kingdom disestablished in 2010
Politics of North Yorkshire